José Javier Serrano (born 1981), better known as Yosigo, is a Spanish fine art photographer. In 2017, he was part of "Un cierto panorama: reciente fotografía de autor en España" ("A Certain Panorama: Recent Author Photography in Spain"), a major exhibition curated by Jesús Micó which showcased the main contemporary Spanish fine art photographers.

He was also co-founder of Have a Nice Book, an online platform about photo-books.

Publications 

 Greetings From (2017)
 Riu Avall (2014)
 Ura Begi-Bistan (2013)
 Mapa de Memoria (2011)
 Kresala (2009)

References

External links 

 Official website
 Profile on 30y3, Spanish photography archive
 Have a Nice Book

1981 births
Living people
Place of birth missing (living people)
Spanish photographers
Fine art photographers